Casarsa is a railway station serving the town of Casarsa della Delizia, in the region of Friuli-Venezia Giulia, northern Italy. The station opened in 1855 and is located on the Venice–Udine railway and Casarsa–Portogruaro railway. The train services are operated by Trenitalia.

History
The station was located on the Gemona del Friuli-Casarsa railway until its closure in 1987.

Train services
The station is served by the following service(s):

Night train (Intercity Notte) Trieste - Udine - Venice - Padua - Bologna - Rome
Express services (Regionale Veloce) Trieste - Gorizia - Udine - Treviso - Venice
Regional services (Treno regionale) Trieste - Gorizia - Udine - Treviso - Venice
Local services (Treno regionale) Portogruaro - Casarsa della Delizia

See also

History of rail transport in Italy
List of railway stations in Friuli-Venezia Giulia
Rail transport in Italy
Railway stations in Italy

References

 This article is based upon a translation of the Italian language version as of January 2016.

External links

Railway stations in Friuli-Venezia Giulia